Placetas is a city in the Villa Clara Province in the center of Cuba; before the change in the country's government in 1959 the province was called Las Villas. The town is also known as  because of its wild laurel trees. Cuba's geographical center, Guaracabulla, is located in this municipality.

History
Placetas was founded on September 9, 1861 mainly due to the sugar production industry. Nowadays, the main produce of the area is tobacco. The main contribution to its foundation came from Jose Martinez-Fortun y Erles, a Spanish Marques and former colonel in the Spanish Army. The town is located on the Carretera Central road, which cuts through the town.  The town's position on this road has allowed it to serve as a stop for many travellers. Placetas has grown considerably over the years, being declared a town in 1881 and a city in 1925. In 1879 it was established as its own municipality. Placetas is also known by the great carnavals which take place in July and Christmas and New Year's Eve.

Until the 1977 administrative reform, Placetas was divided into the following barrios: Cabecera (Placetas town proper), Guaracabulla (or Guaracabuya), Hernando, Nazareno, San Andres, Sitio Potrero and Tibisial. Annual celebrations displaying the local pride of each barrio used to take place until the 1990s, when the government stopped them.

Geography
Placetas lies southwest of its province, next to the borders with the one of Sancti Spíritus. Nearest towns include Zulueta (to the north), Remedios (to the northeast), Cabaiguán and Fomento (to the east), and Santa Clara and Camajuaní (to the west). The springs of Zaza River, that runs from the outskirts of Placets to the sea, are located near the town. The river Zaza is currently an environmental preservation area.

The municipality borders with Manicaragua, Santa Clara, Camajuaní, Remedios, Cabaiguán and Fomento. Its territory includes the villages of Báez, Benito Juárez, Carbó Serviá, Falcón, Falero, Guaracabulla, Hermanos Ameijeiras, Manzanares, Máximo, Miller, Nazareno, Oliver and Suazo.

Demographics
In 2004, the municipality of Placetas had a population of 71,837. The city proper has a population of 42,000.

Economy
The area is primarily a sugar producing region, with three "centrales" sugar producing factories. Placetas also has mayor railroad industries that operate from its area. Many Placetenos have emigrated to other countries and there are around 2300 people from Placetas residing in the United States, most of them in Miami. This contributes to the high amount of comunitarios that travel to Placetas every month from the United States. Nowadays the town also houses many aluminum factories and is known around Cuba as the capital of aluminum because of the export business. One of the main streets in Placetas is the Primera del Oeste street, because is the corner where Cuba's central road and the Parque Casallas meet and because it houses the popular Rumbos, one of the many touristic places recently opened. This street also houses the underground commerce and business of the town. It is referred to by Placetenos as La Calle 8 de Placetas, in reference to 8th St. in Miami.All sugar millas have closed down, there is no industry and the supermarkets are empty

Architecture
The main Catholic church in the town is called San Atanasio de Placetas, after the town's patron saint. As of 1996, it had one library, a main post office, three middle-high schools (13 de Marzo, Rodolfo Leon Perlacia and Julio Antonio Mella), one police station and many recreational areas. Most of the downtown's structures were built before the 1959 government of Fidel Castro, and little of the town has been renovated since.

Notable people

Miguel Díaz-Canel (b. 1960), President of Cuba since 2018.
Pepin Garcia (b. 1950), Cuban-American businessman
Emilio Mola (1887-1937), Spanish-born general and instigator of the Spanish Civil War
 La Chelito (1885–1959), Cuban-born Spanish cuplé singer from the early 20th-century
 Alberto Rojas Espinoza (1868-1912), colonel of Cuban Liberation Army during Cuba's 1895 War of Independence from Spain and major of the municipality in 1901 and 1912.

See also
Municipalities of Cuba
List of cities in Cuba

References

External links

Encyclopædia Britannica. Placetas

 
Cities in Cuba
Populated places in Villa Clara Province
1861 establishments in North America
Populated places established in 1861
1861 establishments in the Spanish Empire